Bijî may refer to:
 Biji (soy pulp), a food
 Bijiguk, one of the historic small statelets that formed Silla
 Biji (Chinese literature)
Biji - Punjabi word for Mom or grandmother
  - Kurdish word for "Long live" or "Viva" (Bijî Kurdistan meaning Long live Kurdistan)